The Vițău is a right tributary of the river Putna in Romania. It flows into the Putna in the village Putna.

References

Rivers of Romania
Rivers of Suceava County